January Yusuf Makamba (born 28 January 1974) is a Tanzanian CCM politician and Member of Parliament for Bumbuli constituency since 2010. In December 2015, he was appointed as a Minister of State in the Vice President’s Office for Union Affairs and Environment.

On 12 September 2021 he was appointed as Minister of Energy by the President Samia Suluhu Hassan.

Early life and career
Makamba was born in Singida Region and is the eldest of four children. His father, Yusuf Makamba, a stalwart of the country's dominant ruling party, the Chama Cha Mapinduzi (CCM) and had served as its Secretary General. His mother, Josephine, is from Missenyi District in Kagera Region. He spent his early childhood in his ancestral home of Mahezangulu village in Lushoto District and at his maternal grandmother's village in Kagera Region, which was at the time invaded by Ugandan troops during the Uganda–Tanzania War.

He was educated at Handeni and Galanos secondary schools in Secondary School; and at Forest Hill High School. He attended Quincy College in Massachusetts, United States for a preliminary course before transferring to Saint John's University in Minnesota, where he majored in Peace Studies. He then undertook an internship at the Carter Center, before obtaining his MSc in Conflict Analysis and Resolution from the School for Conflict Analysis and Resolution at George Mason University in 2004.

Upon his return to Tanzania, he joined the Foreign Ministry as a Foreign Service Officer (Grade II). Jakaya Kikwete, the Foreign Minister at the time would later on vie for the presidency in the 2005 election. Makamba joined his campaign team and traversed across the country visiting all the districts. Following Kikwete's landslide victory of over 80 percent, he was appointed as an aide to the President. His formal title was Personal Assistant to the President – Special Duties (PAP-SD); a position that he would serve for five years until 2010.

Political career

In 2010, he contested in the election as a Member of Parliament for his home constituency of Bumbuli and was elected unopposed. In the 10th Parliament, he served as the Chairman of the Parliamentary Committee for Energy and Minerals.

In April 2011, he replaced Bernard Membe as CCM's Political Affairs and International Relations Secretary and served in this post until November 2012 when he was succeeded by Asha-Rose Migiro at the 8th National Congress of the CCM. Makamba was also elected as one of the ten members of the National Executive Committee (NEC) from the mainland part of the country. He received the second highest number of votes (2,093).

In May 2012, President Kikwete appointed him as the Deputy Minister of Communication, Science and Technology following a cabinet reshuffle. In July, he launched the Bumbuli Development Corporation, a personal initiative that would seek to supplement the government's effort in bringing development to his constituency. In August 2014, he was nominated by Vodacom Tanzania CEO to participate in the Ice Bucket Challenge in order to raise awareness for obstetric fistula patients in Tanzania; or donate US$100. Makamba decided to donate TSh  (US$600) instead.

In October 2014, Makamba was quoted advocating dictatorship as a means to end graft in politics.

2015 presidential campaign
On 2 July 2014, he announced on BBC Television in London that he was 90%
certain that he would contest in his party's primaries
for the presidency, he was the first candidate to declare IKULU position for
the 2015 election, and after that slew of candidates announced.

On 9 July 2014, President Kikwete whilst on a four-day official tour
of  Tanga
Region, addressed Makamba's constituents and praised their MP for his work.
On his presidential ambition, Kikwete advised him to look at him as an example.
President Kikwete ran first time for the presidency in 1995, he did not succeed
but second time in 2005 he was elected. President Kikwete told Makamba that
when the time comes, he would get the presidency.
5].

During his 2015 presidential campaign,
Makamba launched a book authored by Fr. Karugendo titled 40
Questions 40 Answers: A Conversation with January Makamba.
The book was  prefaced by retired
President Ali Hassan Mwinyi, was detailed with his
vision for  #TanzaniaMpya meaning The New Tanzania with  top priority on job creation
and if elected, he will introduce a jobs bill that will need about $2 billion.
Other priorities were social services, and good governance.

During the CCM presidential primaries, January Makamba was
the youngest of the five politicians that made it to CCM’s top 5 presidential candidates,
beating CCM veterans including former Prime Ministers, Vice President, and
party veterans.  After Dr. John Magufuli
secured CCM nomination, Makamba returned to Bumbuli constituency where he was
re-elected into second term by 84% of the total votes. Also, during 2015
Presidential elections, he was part of 32 cadres that made up CCM Campaign Committee, doubling as
spokesperson of the campaign and in-charge of CCM communications during the
entire campaign. Makamba also was a member of small team selected by CCM
Chairman to prepare party’s manifesto (Ilani 
ya uchaguzi) for five years period 2015-2020.

Personal life
Makamba is a Muslim. He is married to Ramona and is the father of two children. He is an avid football fan and supports Simba S.C., Coastal Union, Chelsea and Real Madrid.

Honours and awards
2013: Young Global Leader by the World Economic Forum
2013: National Democratic Institute’s Democracy Award
2014: 10 Most Powerful Men In Africa, Forbes Magazine

References

External links

 
 
 40 Questions 40 Answers: A Conversation with January Makamba (PDF) in Kiswahili

1974 births
Living people
Tanzanian Muslims
Chama Cha Mapinduzi MPs
Tanzanian MPs 2010–2015
Tanzanian MPs 2015–2020
Deputy government ministers of Tanzania
Galanos Secondary School alumni
Forest Hill Secondary School alumni
College of Saint Benedict and Saint John's University alumni
George Mason University alumni
People from Singida Region
Energy ministers
Government ministers of Tanzania